This is a list of museums in Calabria, Italy.

References 

Calabria